Tyrone McKenzie (born December 11, 1985) is an American football coach and former linebacker. He was drafted by the New England Patriots in the third round of the 2009 NFL Draft. He debuted for the Tampa Bay Buccaneers in 2010 and also played for the Minnesota Vikings. He played college football at South Florida.

Early years
McKenzie attended Riverview High School where he was a first-team All-Hillsborough County selection by the Tampa Tribune and second-team all-county pick by the St. Petersburg Times as a running back.

College career

Michigan State
McKenzie played college football at Michigan State in 2004, playing in 11 games as a true freshman, recording three tackles.

Iowa State
McKenzie transferred to Iowa State after the 2004 season. After sitting out the 2005 season due to NCAA transferring rules, McKenzie earned second-team All-Big 12 Conference after recording 129 tackles, two sacks, four forced fumbles, and an interception in 12 games.

South Florida
Before the 2007 season, McKenzie transferred to the University of South Florida, receiving a hardship waiver from the NCAA allowing him to play immediately. McKenzie had transferred to be closer to his widowed mother who was injured in a car accident and lost her business; McKenzie worked the overnight shift at a Hampton Inn in order to support her. In 2007, he earned second-team All-Big East honors after setting a school record and team-leading 121 tackles. He also had 1.5 sacks, two forced fumbles, two fumble recoveries and a blocked kick. As a senior in 2008, McKenzie once again led the Bulls in tackles with 116 and earned first-team All-Big East honors. He also had a sack and an interception and set a USF record for tackles over consecutive seasons with 237.

McKenzie finished his college career starting 36 of 49 games, recording 369 tackles, 4.5 sacks, six forced fumbles, two fumble recoveries, 16 pass deflections, two interceptions and a safety.

Professional career

Pre-draft

New England Patriots
McKenzie was drafted by the New England Patriots in the third round of the 2009 NFL Draft. On May 2, 2009, during rookie minicamp, McKenzie tore the ACL in his right knee after getting tangled up with a running back. He was signed to a four-year contract on August 25 and subsequently placed on injured reserve.

McKenzie was waived on September 5, 2010. He was re-signed to the team's practice squad the next day after clearing waivers. He was released from the practice squad on November 6, 2010.

Tampa Bay Buccaneers
McKenzie was signed by the Tampa Bay Buccaneers to their practice squad on November 8, 2010. He was promoted to the Buccaneers' active roster on December 14, 2010. He was cut on September 2, 2011.

Minnesota Vikings
McKenzie was signed to the Vikings practice squad on September 7, 2011. He was named to the active 53-man roster during the final cuts before the start of the 2012 NFL Season.
McKenzie was released by the Vikings on August 31, 2013 (along with 18 others) to get to a 53-man roster.

Coaching career
After being an assistant special teams coach for the Los Angeles Rams, 
McKenzie joined the Tennessee Titans as a linebackers coach in 2018.

Detroit Lions
McKenzie joined the Detroit Lions as a linebackers coach in 2020. He missed the team's week 16 game against the Tampa Bay Buccaneers due to COVID-19 protocols.

Miami Dolphins
On January 19, 2023, McKenzie was fired as an outside linebackers coach by the Miami Dolphins.

References

External links
Miami Dolphins bio
South Florida Bulls bio

1985 births
Living people
Sportspeople from Queens, New York
Players of American football from New York City
American football linebackers
Michigan State Spartans football players
Iowa State Cyclones football players
South Florida Bulls football players
New England Patriots players
Tampa Bay Buccaneers players
Minnesota Vikings players
Los Angeles Rams coaches
Detroit Lions coaches
Riverview High School (Riverview, Florida)
Miami Dolphins coaches